The flora of Japan comprises a large assemblage of plant species which can be found in Japan, such as sakura, katsura, momiji and azalea. There are many species which are endemic to Japan.

Diversity 
Japan has significant diversity in flora. Of approximately 5,600 total vascular plant species, almost 40% are endemic. This richness is due to the significant variation in latitude and altitude across the country, a diversity of climatic conditions due to monsoons, and multiple geohistorical incidences of connections with the mainland.

Vegetation types 
Japan consists of roughly 4 vegetation zones that are delineated by temperature and precipitation: the alpine region, subalpine region, summer-green broad-leaved forest region and evergreen broad-leaved forest region.

Due to its substantial length of over 3,000 km from north to south and its mountain ranges that can exceed 3,000 meters, Japan's vegetation varies by latitude and by altitude. Evergreen forests tend to appear in the southern half of the Japanese mainland, with broad leaf forests, subalpine, and alpine appearing with increasing frequency to the north and near mountains.

Evergreen broad-leaved forest region 

The evergreen forest zone can be found along the coasts of the southern half of Japan and is most common zone in the Ryukyu Islands, Shikoku and, Kyushu as well as parts of southwestern Honshu with equal longitude. This region rises up to an elevation of 750 meters near Tokyo. At the coasts, the dominant forest canopy species are Castanopsis cuspidata and Machilus thunbergii. Inland, trees belonging to the genus Quercus are dominant. In lower layers, trees and shrub species include Camellia japonica, Neolitsea sericea, Aucuba japonica, and Eurya japonica. It is a characteristic of this zone that all these are evergreen species.

Summergreen broad-leaved forest region 
These forests can be found in central Japan above 1,000 meters altitude and throughout parts of Hokkaido at elevations between 700 and 1,600 meters. These forests are also called Fagus crenata forests due to the prevalence of this tree species. On the western side, common species include Daphniphyllum macropodum, Cephalotaxus harringtonii, and Aucuba japonica. On the eastern side facing the Pacific Ocean, important species include Ulmus japonica, Arachniodes standishii , and Laportea macrostachya. This region has been particularly affected by human development and clearing of natural forests. Cleared lands tend to be replanted with Larix kaempferi, Cryptomeria japonica , and Chamaecyparis obtusa.

Subalpine and alpine regions 
In Honshu, from 1,600 to 2,500 meters, and Hokkaido at slightly lower altitudes, character species in the subalpine zone are Vaccinium vitis-idaea, Vaccinium ovalifolium, Neottia cordata, Coptis trifolia. Distinguishing trees include Abies mariesii, Larix kaempferi, and Tsuga diversifolia.

Above 2500 meters, vegetation has to contend with significant snowfall and high winds. Genera that can survive in these conditions include Phyllodoce and Harrimanella.

List

Cercidiphyllum
Japanese maple
Azalea
Chrysanthemum
Reynoutria japonica
Japanese beech
Konara
Cherry blossom
Pinus pumila
Hinoki cypress
Japanese red pine
sakaki evergreen
Japanese red cedar
Pinus luchuensis
Cryptotaenia japonica
Acer ginnala
Wasabi
Nandina
Japanese holly
Japanese iris
Juniperus procumbens
Pittosporum tobira
Hosta
Styrax japonicus
Wisteria floribunda
Japanese black pine
Prunus × yedoensis
Pinus amamiana
Acer japonicum
Sciadopitys
Myoga
Chamaecyparis pisifera
Gastrodia amamiana
Juglans ailantifolia
Yomogi

Publications 
The flora of Japan is extensively described in scientific publications such as :
 Makino, T., 1940. Illustrated flora of Japan. Hokuryukan (with renewed editions in 1961 and 1996)
 Ohwi, J., 1965. Flora of Japan (in English). A combined, much revised, and extended translation. Smithsonian Institution, Washington D.C.
 Iwatsuki, K. (岩槻, 邦男), Boufford, D.E. & Ohba, H. (大場, 秀章), 1993-2020. Flora of Japan. Kodansha
 vol. 1 : Pteridophyta and Gymnospermae (1995)
 vol. 2a-c : Angiospermae, Dicotyledoneae, Archichlamydeae (1999-2006)
 vol. 3a-b : Angiospermae, Dicotyledoneae, Sympetalae (1993-1995)
 vol. 4a-b : Angiospermae, Monocotyledoneae (a 2020, b 2016)
 General index (2020)

More over, here are some publications of interest about the japanese flora :
Tomitarô Makino, who was lecturer of botany at the imperial university of Tokyo, published a large amount of contributions from 1901 to 1914 collectively called "Observations on the flora of Japan" (and before that some other under various names among which "Plantæ Japonenses novæ vel minus cognitæ")
 Makino, T., 1901-1905. Observations on the Flora of Japan (Fascicula 1-5)
 Makino, T., 1896-1914. Observations on the Flora of Japan. published within the botanical journal (in japanese : 植物学雑誌, romanized : "Shokubutsugaku Zasshi") edited by the Botanical Society of Japan

See also 
 List of ecoregions in Japan
 Wildlife of Japan

References